The first  was an alliance between Britain and Japan, signed in January 1902. The alliance was signed in London at Lansdowne House on 30 January 1902 by Lord Lansdowne, British Foreign Secretary, and Hayashi Tadasu, Japanese diplomat. A diplomatic milestone that saw an end to Britain's "Splendid isolation" (a policy of avoiding permanent alliances), the Anglo-Japanese alliance was renewed and expanded in scope twice, in 1905 and 1911, playing a major role in World War I before the alliance's demise in 1921 and termination in 1923. 

The main threat for both sides was from Russia. France was concerned about war with Britain and, in cooperation with Britain, abandoned its ally, Russia, to avoid blame for the Russo-Japanese War of 1904. France supported Russia economically against Japan anyways. However, Britain siding with Japan angered the United States and some British dominions, whose opinion of the Empire of Japan worsened and gradually became hostile.

Motivations and reservations

The possibility of an alliance between Great Britain and Japan had been canvassed since 1895, when Britain refused to join the Triple Intervention of France, Germany and Russia against the Japanese occupation of the Liaodong Peninsula. While this single event was an unstable basis for an alliance, the case was strengthened by the support Britain had given Japan in its drive towards modernisation and their co-operative efforts to put down the Boxer Rebellion. Newspapers of both countries voiced support for such an alliance; in Britain, Francis Brinkley of The Times and Edwin Arnold of the Telegraph were the driving force behind such support, while in Japan the pro-alliance mood of politician Ōkuma Shigenobu stirred the Mainichi and Yomiuri newspapers into pro-alliance advocacy. The 1894 Anglo-Japanese Treaty of Commerce and Navigation had also paved the way for equal relations and the possibility of an alliance.

In the end, the common interest truly fuelling the alliance was opposition to Russian expansion, such as the invasion of Manchuria continuing after the Boxer Rebellion. This was made clear as early as the 1890s, when the British diplomat Cecil Spring Rice identified that Britain and Japan working in concert was the only way to challenge Russian power in the region. Negotiations began when Russia began to move into China. Nevertheless, both countries had their reservations. Britain was cautious about abandoning its policy of "splendid isolation", wary of antagonizing Russia, and unwilling to act on the treaty if Japan were to attack the United States. There were factions in the Japanese government that still hoped for a compromise with Russia, including the highly powerful political figure Hirobumi Itō, who had served four terms as Prime Minister of Japan. It was thought that friendship within Asia would be more amenable to the US, which was uncomfortable with the rise of Japan as a power. Furthermore, Britain was unwilling to protect Japanese interests in Korea and likewise, the Japanese were unwilling to support Britain in India.

Hayashi and Lord Lansdowne began their discussions in July 1901, and disputes over Korea and India delayed them until November. At this point, Hirobumi Itō requested a delay in negotiations in order to attempt a reconciliation with Russia. He was mostly unsuccessful, and Britain expressed concerns over duplicity on Japan's part, so Hayashi hurriedly re-entered negotiations in 1902.  "Splendid isolation" was ended as for the first time Britain saw the need for a peace-time military alliance.  It was the first alliance on equal terms between East and West. For Britain, the revision of "Splendid isolation" spurred by the Anglo-Japanese Alliance, culminated in the Entente Cordiale (1904) with France and Anglo-Russian Convention of 1907.

Terms of the 1902 treaty

The treaty contained six articles:

Article 1
The High Contracting parties, having mutually recognised the independence of China and Korea, declare themselves to be entirely uninfluenced by aggressive tendencies in either country, having in view, however, their special interests, of which those of Great Britain relate principally to China, whilst Japan, in addition to the interests which she possesses in China, is interested in a peculiar degree, politically as well as commercially and industrially in Korea, the High Contracting Parties recognise that it will be admissible for either of them to take such measures as may be indispensable in order to safeguard those interests if threatened either by the aggressive action of any other Power, or by disturbances arising in China or Korea, and necessitating the intervention of either of the High Contracting Parties for the protection of the lives and properties of its subjects.

Article 2
Declaration of neutrality if either signatory becomes involved in war through Article 1.

Article 3
Promise of support if either signatory becomes involved in war with more than one Power.

Article 4
Signatories promise not to enter into separate agreements with other Powers to the prejudice of this alliance.

Article 5
The signatories promise to communicate frankly and fully with each other when any of the interests affected by this treaty are in jeopardy.

Article 6
Treaty to remain in force for five years and then at one years' notice, unless notice was given at the end of the fourth year.

Articles 2 and 3 were most crucial concerning war and mutual defense.

The treaty laid out an acknowledgment of Japanese interests in Korea without obligating Britain to help if a conflict arose where Japan only had one adversary. Japan was likewise not obligated to defend British interests in India unless there were two adversaries.

Although written using careful and clear language, the two sides understood the Treaty slightly differently. Britain saw it as a gentle warning to Russia, while Japan was emboldened by it. From that point on, even those of a moderate stance refused to accept a compromise over the issue of Korea. Extremists saw it as an open invitation for imperial expansion.

1905 and 1911 

The alliance was revamped in 1905. This was partly prompted by Japan's gains in the Russo-Japanese War which prompted a restatement of the Japanese-British agreement. It was also partly  prompted by British suspicions about Japanese intentions in South Asia. Japan appeared to support Indian nationalism, tolerating visits by figures such as Rash Behari Bose. Britain also considered asking Japan to help defend India. The July 1905 renegotiations allowed for Japanese support of British interests in India and British support for Japanese progress into Korea. By November of that year, Korea was a Japanese protectorate, and in February 1906 Itō Hirobumi was posted as the Resident-General to Seoul. At the renewal in 1911, Japanese diplomat Komura Jutarō played a key role to restore Japan's tariff autonomy. 

Although the "second" alliance in 1905 was meant to last a decade, the alliance was renewed earlier in 1911. Over those six years, great power politics had substantially changed, following the Anglo-Russian entente of 1907 settling the Russo-British Great Game; continuing Japanese negotiations in the wake of the Russo-Japanese War, including a 1907 partitioning of Manchuria with Russia; as well as increasing British-American rapprochement and the UK's growing rivalry with the German Empire. In this context, Japan and Britain augmented a "third" Anglo-Japanese alliance to reassure each other of their interests. Komura Jutarō and later Prime Minister Katō Takaaki were major organizers during the 1911 revision.

Effects

Forming alliance and rivalries 

The first version of the alliance was announced on 12 February 1902. In response, Russia sought to form alliances with France and Germany, which Germany declined. On 16 March 1902, a mutual pact was signed between France and Russia. China and the United States were strongly opposed to the alliance.

Unofficial role in Russo-Japanese War 
The Russo-Japanese War broke out in 1904, as Japan sought to halt the expansion of the Russian Empire's colonies in China. Britain did not officially join the Russo-Japanese War, but supported Japan in espionage, ship design, finance, and diplomacy during the war. The Anglo-Japanese Alliance was not activated, because its terms stipulated a promise of support only if a signatory entered war with more than one power, whereas Japan was only at war with Russia. Similarly, the nature of the alliance meant that France was unable to come to Russia's aid, as this would have meant going to war with Britain. This was considered Britain's diplomatic contribution in favour of Japan.

Meanwhile, even before the war, British and Japanese intelligence had co-operated against Russia due to the Anglo-Japanese Alliance. During the war, Indian Army stations in Malaya and China often intercepted and read wireless and telegraph cable traffic relating to the war, which was shared with the Japanese. In their turn, the Japanese shared information about Russia with the British with one British official writing of the "perfect quality" of Japanese intelligence. In particular, British and Japanese intelligence gathered much evidence that Germany was supporting Russia in the war as part of a bid to disturb the balance of power in Europe, which led to British officials increasingly perceiving that country as a threat to the international order.

World War I 

The alliance's provisions for mutual defence permitted Japan to enter the First World War on the British side. The Treaty made possible the Japanese seizure of German possessions in the Pacific north of the equator during the War. Japan attacked the German base at Tsingtao in 1914 and forced the Germans to surrender (see Siege of Tsingtao). Japanese officers aboard British warships were casualties at the Battle of Jutland in 1916. In 1917, Japanese warships were sent to the Mediterranean and assisted in the protection of Allied shipping near Malta from U-boat attacks. A memorial at the Kalkara Naval Cemetery in Malta is dedicated to the 72 Japanese sailors who died in the conflict, including in the 1917 torpedoing of the Japanese destroyer Sakaki.

Cultural exchanges 

The alliance formed the basis for positive trading and cultural exchanges between Britain and Japan.  Japanese agencies published numerous English-language releases and publications. Rapid industrialisation and the development of the Japanese armed forces provided significant new export opportunities for British shipyards and arms manufacturers. Japanese educated in Britain were also able to bring new technology to Japan, such as advances in ophthalmology. British artists of the time such as James McNeill Whistler, Aubrey Beardsley and Charles Rennie Mackintosh were heavily inspired by Japanese kimono, swords, crafts and architecture. 

Unique cultural exchanges included that the author Yoshimoto Tadasu (b. 1878, d. 1973), who wrote True Britain (Shin no Eikoku) in 1902, was the first blind person in Japan to receive higher education, and brought some British ideas on public welfare to Japan. The clergyman Kumagai Tetsutaro (b. 1883, d. 1979) praised the book as having a major impact on opportunities for people with blindness.

The Japan–British Exhibition in 1910 in White City, London had eight million visitors. It sought to promote knowledge of Japan's modernization and the idea of an 'alliance of peoples' between Britain and Japan. It featured Japanese fine arts, musicians, Sumo demonstrations, and influenced by Edwardian expectations, it featured exhibitions of Ainu, Taiwanese and Japanese 'villages'. The organizers portrayed a cultural-historical parallel between Britain and Japan as symmetrical "Island Empires" in East and West. Organized by the Japanese government, it was one of the largest such expositions at its time.

Limitations
Despite the ostensibly friendly relations between Britain and Japan during the early 20th century, the relationship started to strain over various issues. One such strain was the issue of the "racial equality clause" as proposed by the Japanese delegation at the Paris Peace Conference. The clause, which was to be attached to the Covenant of the League of Nations, was compatible with the British stance of equality for all subjects as a principle for maintaining imperial unity; however, there were significant deviations in the stated interests of Britain's dominions, notably Australia, and the British delegation ultimately acceded to imperial opposition and declined to support the clause.

Another strain was the Twenty-One Demands issued by Japan to the Republic of China in 1915. The demands would have drastically increased Japanese influence in China and transformed the Chinese state into a de facto protectorate of Japan. Feeling desperate, the Chinese government appealed to Britain and the U.S., which forced Japan to moderate the demands issued; ultimately, the Japanese government gained little influence in China, but lost prestige amongst the Western nations (including Britain, which was affronted and no longer trusted the Japanese as a reliable ally).

Even though Britain was the wealthiest industrialized power, and Japan was a newly industrialized power with a large export market, which would seem to create natural economic ties, those ties were somewhat limited, which provided a major limitation of the alliance. British banks saw Japan as a risky investment due to what they saw as restrictive property laws and an unstable financial situation, and offered loans to Japan with high interest rates, similar to those they offered the Ottoman Empire, Chile, China, and Egypt, which was disappointing to Japan. The banker and later Prime Minister Takahashi Korekiyo argued that Britain was implying, through unattractive loan terms, that Japan had reverted from one of the "civilized nations" to "undeveloped nations", referring that Japan had more easily received foreign capital to fund its First Sino-Japanese War than the Russo-Japanese War. Nathaniel Rothschild was initially skeptical of Japan's economy; however, he would later describe Osaka as the "Manchester of Japan" and Japan as "one of the countries of the future." Henry Dyer wrote after 1906 that Japanese bonds "has aroused keen interest among British investors, who have always been partial to Japanese bonds." Dyer, a recipient of the Order of the Rising Sun from Emperor Meiji, had played a role in the expansion of industrialization and engineering in Japan as part of a significant foreign investment. Dyer criticized what he saw as widespread British skepticism of Japan's economy. Meanwhile, influential industrialists in Japan such as businessman Iwasaki Yanosuke were at times skeptical of foreign investment, which led the Japanese government to channel it through some controlled enterprises acting as intermediaries with the private sector in London and Tokyo, which was seen as excess regulation by some British industrialists. Nevertheless, Britain did lend capital to Japan during the Russo-Japanese War, while Japan provided major loans to the Entente during World War I.

End of the treaty

The alliance was viewed as an obstacle already at the Paris Peace Conference of 1919–1920. On 8 July 1920, the two governments issued a joint statement to the effect that the alliance treaty "is not entirely consistent with the letter of that Covenant (of the League of Nations), which both Governments earnestly desire to respect".

The demise of the alliance was signaled by the 1921 Imperial Conference, in which British and Dominion leaders convened to determine a unified international policy. One of the major issues of the conference was the renewal of the Anglo–Japanese Alliance. The conference began with all but Canadian Prime Minister Arthur Meighen supporting the immediate renewal of an alliance with Japan. The prevailing hope was for a continuance of the alliance with the Pacific power, which could potentially provide security for British imperial interests in the area. The Australians feared that they could not fend off any advances from the Imperial Japanese Navy, and desired a continuance of the buildup of naval resources for a possible future conflict as they feared that an alliance with the United States (then in a state of post-war isolationism) would provide little protection.

Meighen, fearing that a conflict could develop between Japan and the United States, demanded the British Empire remove itself from the treaty to avoid being forced into a war between the two nations. The rest of the delegates agreed that it was best to court America and try to find a solution that the American government would find suitable, but only Meighen called for the complete abrogation of the treaty. The American government feared that the renewal of the Anglo–Japanese Alliance would create a Japanese-dominated market in the Pacific, and close China off from American trade. These fears were elevated by the news media in America and Canada, which reported alleged secret anti-American clauses in the treaty, and advised the public to support abrogation.

The press, combined with Meighen's convincing argument of Canadian fears that Japan would attack imperial assets in China, caused the Imperial Conference to shelve the alliance. The conference communicated their desire to consider leaving the alliance to the League of Nations, which stated that the alliance would continue, as originally stated with the leaving party giving the other a twelve-month notice of their intentions.

The British Empire decided to sacrifice its alliance with Japan in favour of goodwill with the United States, yet it desired to prevent the expected alliance between Japan and either Germany or Russia from coming into being. Empire delegates convinced America to invite several nations to Washington to participate in talks regarding Pacific and Far East policies, specifically naval disarmament. Japan came to the Washington Naval Conference with a deep mistrust of Britain, feeling that London no longer wanted what was best for Japan.

Despite the growing rift, Japan joined the conference in hopes of avoiding a war with the United States. The Pacific powers of the United States, Japan, France and Britain would sign the Four-Power Treaty, and adding on various other countries such as China to create the Nine-Power Treaty. The Four-Power Treaty would provide a minimal structure for the expectations of international relations in the Pacific, as well as a loose alliance without any commitment to armed alliances. The Four-Power Treaty at the Washington Conference made the Anglo–Japanese Alliance defunct in December, 1921; however, it would not officially terminate until all parties ratified the treaty on 17 August 1923.

At that time, the Alliance was officially terminated, as per Article IV in the Anglo–Japanese Alliance Treaties of 1902 and 1911. The distrust between the Commonwealth and Japan, as well as the manner in which the Anglo–Japanese Alliance concluded, are credited by many scholars as being leading causes in Japan's involvement in World War II.

According to Zoltan Buzas, racially shaped threat perceptions led the British and the Americans to push for the termination of the alliance.

See also
Military alliance
List of military alliances
Anglo-German naval arms race
Anglo-Japanese Treaty of Commerce and Navigation
Eight-Nation Alliance
History of Japanese foreign relations
Japan–Korea Treaty of 1905
Japan–United Kingdom relations
Japanese entry into World War I
Japan during World War I
Root–Takahira Agreement
Open Door Policy
Treaty of Portsmouth

Notes

Further reading
Brebner, J. B. "Canada, The Anglo-Japanese Alliance and the Washington Conference." Political Science Quarterly 50#1 (1935): 45–58. online
 Daniels, Gordon, Janet Hunter, Ian Nish, and David Steeds. (2003). Studies in the Anglo-Japanese Alliance (1902–1923): London School of Economics (LSE), Suntory and Toyota International Centres for Economics and Related Disciplines (STICERD) Paper No. IS/2003/443: Read Full paper (pdf) – May 2008
 Davis, Christina L. "Linkage diplomacy: economic and security bargaining in the Anglo-Japanese alliance, 1902–23." International Security 33.3 (2009): 143–179. online
 Fry, Michael G. "The North Atlantic Triangle and the Abrogation of the Anglo-Japanese Alliance." Journal of Modern History 39.1 (1967): 46–64. online
 Harcreaves, J. D. "The Anglo-Japanese Alliance." History Today (1952) 2#4 pp 252–258 online
 Langer, William.  The Diplomacy of Imperialism 1890–1902 (2nd ed. 1950), pp. 745–86. online free to borrow
 Lister-Hotta, Ayako, Ian Nish, and David Steeds. (2002). Anglo-Japanese Alliance: LSE STICERD Paper No. IS/2002/432: Read Full paper (pdf) – May 2008
 Lowe, Peter. Great Britain and Japan 1911–15: A Study of British Far Eastern Policy (Springer, 1969). 
 Nish, Ian Hill. (1972).  Alliance in Decline: A Study in Anglo-Japanese Relations 1908–23.  London: Athlone Press.   (cloth)
 __. (1966).   The Anglo-Japanese Alliance: The diplomacy of two island empires 1894–1907. London: Athlone Press. [reprinted by RoutledgeCurzon, London, 2004.  (paper)]
 O'Brien, Phillips Payson. (2004).  The Anglo-Japanese Alliance, 1902–1922. London: RoutledgeCurzon.   cloth)
 Satow, Ernest and George Alexander Lensen. (1968). Korea and Manchuria between Russia and Japan 1895–1904: The Observations of Sir Ernest Satow, British Minister Plenipotentiary to Japan (1895–1900) and China (1900–1906). Tokyo: Sophia University Press/Tallahassee, Florida: Diplomatic Press. ASIN B0007JE7R6; ASIN: B000NP73RK
Spinks, Charles N. "The Termination of the Anglo-Japanese Alliance." Pacific Historical Review 6#4 (1937): 321–340. online
 Steiner, Zara S. "Great Britain and the Creation of the Anglo-Japanese Alliance." Journal of Modern History 31.1 (1959): 27–36. online

External links
Main points of the Anglo-Japanese agreements – by FirstWorldWar.com
Text of the Anglo-Japanese Alliance of 1902 (bilingual)
 Beasley, W. G. (1962).  The Modern History of Japan. Boston: Frederick A. Praeger. ASIN B000HHFAWE (cloth) –  (paper)

Japan–United Kingdom military relations
Military alliances involving the United Kingdom
Military alliances involving Japan
1902 in the United Kingdom
1902 in Japan
Treaties concluded in 1902
Treaties entered into force in 1902
20th-century military alliances
Treaties of the Empire of Japan
Treaties of the United Kingdom (1801–1922)
Japan–United Kingdom treaties
January 1902 events